The Astrophysical Observatory of Javalambre is a Spanish astronomical observatory located in the municipality of Arcos de las Salinas, Teruel. The facilities are located in the Pico del Buitre 1957 meters up in the Sierra de Javalambre. The observatory is managed by the Center for Physics Studies of the Cosmos of Aragon (CEFCA), dependent on the Department of Science, University and Knowledge Society Government of Aragon.

History 

The Pico del Buitre is one of the best places in the world to observe space given its low light pollution. The first installation for this purpose began in 1992, although it was discontinued due to lack of funding. The project was resumed in 2007, 2 and in 2008 the Aragón Cosmos Physics Studies Center was created, in charge of developing the Javalambre Astrophysical Observatory (OAJ).

Mission 

The initial objective of the OAJ is to map all the visible space to study Dark Energy and Astrophysics. The observatory mainly carries out two projects, J-PLUS4 and J-PAS. In addition, the observatory gives a percentage of their hours of observation to other research projects through competitive access calls.

Telescope 
The OAJ mainly consists of two professional wide field of view (FoV) telescopes with image quality throughout the field: the JST / T250 telescope, Javalambre Survey Telescope, a 2.55 m wide range telescope with a 3 degree field of view, and the JAST / T80, Auxiliary Survey Telescope, an 80 cm telescope with a 2-degree field of view. Both telescopes are equipped with state-of-the-art panoramic cameras with large format CCDs and a unique set of optical filters specially designed to map the Universe across the entire optical spectrum range unprecedented in international astrophysics.

References

Astronomical observatories in Spain
Buildings and structures in Aragon